The 2012 Belgian Figure Skating Championships took place between 25 and 26 November 2011 for singles and pairs and on 18 February 2012 for ice dance and synchronized in Deurne. Skaters competed in the disciplines of men's singles and ladies' singles across the levels of senior, junior, advanced novice, as well as the age-group levels of minime/miniem A, B, and C.

Results

Men

Ladies

External links
 SkateBelgium
 Results

Belgian Figure Skating Championships
Belgian Figure Skating Championships, 2012
2011 in figure skating